Nande, also known as (Oru)Ndandi and Yira, is a Bantu language spoken in the Democratic Republic of the Congo. 

The Nande of Congo and the Konjo people of Uganda are a single ethnic group, which they call Yira (Bayira). They trace their origins to the Ruwenzori Mountains between the two countries. The languages Nande and Konjo are close enough to be considered divergent dialects. Nande has a number of dialects of its own: Nande proper, Kumbule, Mate, Tangi, Sanza, Shu, Songola (Songoora, Nyangala), Swaga / Kira (in Nande, all of these are prefixed with eki-). 

For the varieties of this language known as Shu we are given the information  that another language, "EkiShukaali" was formerly spoken by the women, the AvaShukaali. This may be a specific reference to some kind of "secret jargon" into which the girls, and not boys, were initiated. 

Some of the Nande of Congo have a patron–vassal relationship with the Efé Pygmies.

Phonology

Consonants 

 Palatal and labio-velar glides [j, w] are only heard as a result of front vowels /i, ɪ, ɛ/ or back vowels /u, ʊ, ɔ/ preceding other vowels, or in stem-initial positions between two vowels.
 Voiceless plosives /p, t, k/ can be freely heard as voiced [b, d, ɡ] among speakers, or voiced stops may also occur in loanwords.

Vowels 

 Sounds /ɛ, ɔ/ can also occur as more tense (close) vowels [e, o] within stems containing tense vowels (like /i, u/), or within stems in plural form.

References

External links
 Kinande: A Grammar Sketch (Version 1.0) 

Great Lakes Bantu languages
Languages of the Democratic Republic of the Congo